HMS Duncan was a 74-gun third-rate ship of the line of the Royal Navy, launched on 2 December 1811 at Deptford Wharf.

She was placed on harbour service in 1834, and was broken up in 1863.

Notes

References

Lavery, Brian (2003) The Ship of the Line - Volume 1: The development of the battlefleet 1650-1850. Conway Maritime Press. .

Ships of the line of the Royal Navy
Vengeur-class ships of the line
Ships built in Deptford
1811 ships